Fahad Abdalla Ahmad Al Kassar Banihammad (Arabic: فهد عبد الله احمد الكسار بني حماد; born 1973) is an Emirati football referee who has been a full international referee for FIFA.

Al-Kassar became a FIFA referee in 2011 and also refereed at the regional league, such as the 2011 SEA Games.

References 

1973 births
Living people
Emirati football referees